The RIM-162 Evolved SeaSparrow Missile (ESSM) is a development of the RIM-7 Sea Sparrow missile used to protect ships from attacking missiles and aircraft. ESSM is designed to counter supersonic maneuvering anti-ship missiles. ESSM also has the ability to be "quad-packed" in the Mark 41 Vertical Launch System, allowing up to four ESSMs to be carried in a single cell.

Design
The original Sea Sparrow was an expedient design intended to provide short-range defensive fire in a system that could be deployed as rapidly as possible. The AIM-7 Sparrow was the simplest solution as its radar guidance allowed it to be fired head-on at targets and this guidance was easily provided by mounting an aircraft radar on a trainable platform. In the years after its introduction, it was upgraded to follow improvements being made in the air-to-air Sparrow models used by the US Navy and US Air Force. The ultimate version in this line of weapons was the R model, which introduced a new dual-seeker homing system and many other upgrades. After that point, the AIM-120 AMRAAM offered higher performance from a missile that was smaller and lighter, and development of the Sparrow ended in the 1990s.

This left only the Sea Sparrow using the basic platform, and it no longer had to fit on aircraft. So instead of simply using the P and R models as they were, it was decided to dramatically upgrade the weapon as the Evolved SeaSparrow. The ESSM emerged as a completely new weapon, common only in name with the original, although using all of the same support equipment allowing it to be fit to ships already mounting the older models. Compared to the Sea Sparrow, ESSM has a larger, more powerful rocket motor for increased range and agility, as well as upgraded aerodynamics using strakes and skid-to-turn. In addition, ESSM takes advantage of the latest missile guidance technology, with different versions for Aegis/AN/SPY-1, Sewaco/Active Phased Array Radar (APAR), and traditional target illumination all-the-way.

In the 2000s the NATO Seasparrow Project Office began planning an upgraded Block 2 version of the ESSM. In 2014 Canada pledged 200M CAD to underwrite their share of the Block 2's development cost. ESSM Block 2 leverages the existing Block 1 rocket motor and features a dual-mode X band seeker, increased maneuverability, and other enhancements. Block 2 features enhanced communications systems that allow for mid-course guidance correction, which makes the missiles easy to network into the Navy's emerging Cooperative Engagement Capability. Unlike Block 1, Block 2's active radar homing seeker will support terminal engagement without the launch ship's target illumination radars. The upgraded blast-fragmentation warhead was designed, developed and is being produced by Roketsan. The improved ESSM Block II will be fielded by the US Navy from 2020.

Launchers

Mk 29

The original launcher is Mark 29 Guided Missile Launching System Mod. 4 & 5 (Mk 29 GMLS Mod 4 & 5), which is developed from earlier models Mk 29 Mod 1/2/3 for Sea Sparrow. Mk 29 launchers provide on-mount stowage and launching capability for firing up to eight missiles in a self-contained environmentally controlled trainable launcher design.

Mk 41

The Mark 41 Vertical Launching System is the primary launch system for the Evolved SeaSparrow Missile. The Mk 41 is deployed aboard destroyers and frigates, primarily of the United States and allied nations. The ESSM is quadpacked within a Mk 41 cell allowing a significantly increased missile load over SM-2.

Mk 48
In addition to the Mk 29 GMLS and Mk 41 VLS, the other primary launcher is Mk 48 VLS.  The 2-cell module of Mk 48 makes the system very versatile and enables it to be installed on board in spaces that otherwise cannot be utilized. The weight of a 2-cell module of Mk 48 is 660 kg (1,450 lb; including empty canisters), 330 kg (725 lb) for exhaust system, and 360 kg (800 lb) for ship installation interfaces. Each canister of the Mk 48 VLS houses a single RIM-7VL (Vertically Launched) Sea Sparrow cell or two RIM-162 ESSM cells, though, with modification, other missiles can also be launched.  There are a total of four models in the Mk 48 family, with Mod 0 & 1 housing either 2 RIM-7VL or 4 RIM-162 cells, Mod 2 housing either 16 RIM-7VL or 32 RIM-162 cells. Mod 0/1/2 are usually grouped into either a 16-cell module for RIM-7VL or a 32-cell module for RIM-162. Mod 3 fits into the StanFlex modules on Royal Danish Navy ships and can house either 6 RIM-7VL or 12 RIM-162 cells; the Danes now use the latter.

Mk 56
The successor of the Mk 48 VLS is the Mark 56 Guided Missile Vertical Launching System (Mk 56 GMVLS) or simply Mk 56. In comparison to its predecessor, the Mk 56 utilizes a greater percentage of composite material, reducing the weight by more than 20%. The Mexican Navy will be one of the customers of the Mk 56, using an 8-cell launcher on their Sigma-class design frigates.

Specifications:

Mark 57 (Mk 57)
The Mk 57 Peripheral Vertical Launching System (PVLS), an evolution of Mk 41 VLS, is used on Zumwalt-class destroyers. It is designed to be installed on the ship periphery instead of centralized magazines. It comes in 4-cell launcher modules and provides backwards compatibility with existing missiles, while allowing new missiles with significantly increased propulsion and payloads.

AMRAAM-ER

The AMRAAM-ER is an Extended Range upgrade to the AIM-120 AMRAAM missile for the NASAMS ground-based air defense system, which combines ESSM rocket motor with the AMRAAM two-stage seeker head.

Operational history

US operational evaluation was conducted in July 2002 aboard . Initial operational capability did not occur until later.

In October 2003, at the USN Pacific Missile Range Facility near Hawaii, Australian frigate  conducted a successful firing of an ESSM. The firing was also the first operational use of the CEA Technologies CWI for guidance.

This firing was the first ever live firing involving a full-size ship-borne active electronically scanned array (i.e. the APAR radar) guiding a missile using the Interrupted Continuous Wave Illumination (ICWI) technique in an operational environment. As related by Jane's Navy International:

During the tracking and missile-firing tests, target profiles were provided by Greek-built EADS/3Sigma Iris PVK medium-range subsonic target drones. [...] According to the RNLN, ... "APAR immediately acquired the missile and maintained track until destruction". [...] These ground-breaking tests represented the world's first live verification of the ICWI technique.

In August 2004, a German Navy  completed a series of live missile firings at the Point Mugu missile launch range off the coast of California that included a total of 11 ESSM missile firings. The tests included firings against target drones such as the Northrop BQM-74E Chukkar III and Teledyne Ryan BQM-34S Firebee I, as well as against missile targets such as the Beech AQM-37C and air-launched Kormoran 1 anti-ship missiles.

The tests involved three live-firing events (two of which involved the ESSM) including firing a single SM-2 Block IIIA at an Iris target drone at long range, a single ESSM at an Iris target drone, and a two-salvo launch (with one salvo comprising two SM-2 Block IIIAs and the other comprising two ESSMs) against two incoming Iris target drones.

On 14 May 2013, the ESSM intercepted a high-diving supersonic test target, demonstrating the ability to hit high-G maneuvering, low-velocity air threats, as well as surface targets.  No software changes were needed to prove the ESSM's enhanced capability.

On 30 August 2015, during the annual 'Co-operation Afloat Readiness and Training' ('CARAT') exercise, the ESSM was fired from the Royal Thai Navy Naresuan-class guided-missile frigate HTMS Naresuan and achieved a direct hit on a BQM-74E drone missile launched from the USN amphibious dock landing ship USS Germantown.

On 9 October 2016,  fired one RIM-162 ESSM and two SM-2s to defend against two incoming Houthi anti-ship cruise missiles, potentially Chinese-built C-802 missiles.  It is unknown if the RIM-162 was responsible for intercepting either of the missiles, but the incident marked the first time the ESSM was used in a combat situation. 

In 2018, the ESSM Block 2 passed its first live fire test, successfully intercepting a BQM-74E target drone using its active guidance seeker-head.

Operators

Source: US Navy—Fact File: Evolved Seasparrow Missile

ESSM Consortium Members:

 
 
 
 
 
 
 
 
 
 
 
 
 

Foreign Military Sales (FMS):

See also 
 K-SAAM
 CAMM (missile family)
 HQ-16
 Buk missile system
 VL-SRSAM
 List of missiles

References

External links 

 Designation Systems.net: Raytheon RIM-162 ESSM
 Global Security.org: RIM-162 Evolved Sea Sparrow Missile (ESSM)
 NATO SEASPARROW Project Office
 NAMMO Raufoss - Nordic Ammunition Company

RIM162